Ethanai Konam Ethanai Parvai is a unreleased Indian Tamil-language film that was completed in 1982. The film was directed by editor B. Lenin, photographed by his brother Kannan, starring Thiagarajan, Sripriya, Suresh and Nalini. Based on Jayakanthan's novel of the same name, the film was again in the news when Indo-Russian Cultural Friendship Society decided to release an album containing the songs of Jayakanthan in 2016.

Cast 
Thiagarajan
Sripriya
Suresh
Nalini
Charuhasan
Vadivukkarasi

Soundtrack 
The music for this film was composed by Ilaiyaraaja. Lyrics by Jayakanthan. The song "Alaipayuthe Kanna" (a remix of Venkata Kavi's song of the same name) became popular.

RAGAS

References

External links 
 

Films based on Indian novels
Films scored by Ilaiyaraaja
Unreleased Tamil-language films